Shergold is a surname. Notable people with the surname include: 

Adrian Shergold, British film and television director
Billy Shergold, Welsh footballer
Craig Shergold (born 1979), British cancer patient who received 350 million greeting cards, a world record
Peter Shergold (born 1946), Australian academic
Wilf Shergold (born 1943), English footballer